Sonotrella is a genus of crickets in the subfamily Podoscirtinae and tribe Podoscirtini.  Species have been recorded in: southern China, Indo-China and west Malesia.

Species 
Sonotrella includes the following species:
subgenus not determined
Sonotrella maculithorax (Chopard, 1930)
Sonotrella pallida (Walker, 1869)
subgenus Calyptotrella Gorochov, 2002
Sonotrella bicolor Ingrisch, 1997
Sonotrella bipunctata Chopard, 1969
Sonotrella bispinosa Chopard, 1969
Sonotrella indicativa Gorochov, 2002
Sonotrella lobata Chopard, 1969
Sonotrella omissa Gorochov, 2002
Sonotrella quadrivittata Liu, Shi & Ou, 2006
Sonotrella spectata Gorochov, 2002
subgenus Megatrella Gorochov, 2002
Sonotrella grandipennis Chopard, 1929
Sonotrella optima Gorochov, 2002
Sonotrella remota Gorochov, 2002
Sonotrella tenebra (Ingrisch, 1997)
Sonotrella typica Gorochov, 2002
Sonotrella willemsei (Chopard, 1925)
subgenus Sonotrella Gorochov, 1988
Sonotrella crumbi (Chopard, 1969)
Sonotrella diluta Gorochov, 2002
Sonotrella exculta Gorochov, 1992
Sonotrella inflata Gorochov, 2002
Sonotrella laosensis Liu, Zhang & Shi, 2016
Sonotrella major Liu, Yin & Wang, 1993
Sonotrella mekongica Gorochov, 1988 - type species (locality: environs of Mekong River, Vietnam)
Sonotrella proxima Gorochov, 1990
Sonotrella virescens Gorochov, 1990

References

External links
Images at iNaturalist
 

Ensifera genera
crickets
Orthoptera of Indo-China